Vermont's 3rd congressional district is an obsolete district. It was created in 1803.  It was eliminated after the 1880 Census. Its last Congressman was William W. Grout.

List of members representing the district

References

 Congressional Biographical Directory of the United States 1774–present

Former congressional districts of the United States
03
1803 establishments in Vermont
1883 disestablishments in Vermont
Constituencies established in 1803
Constituencies disestablished in 1883